Love and Money is the ninth studio album by rock artist Eddie Money. It was released in 1995.

Track listing
 "After This Love Is Gone" (John Clifforth, Larry Tagg, Sheppard Solomon) - 4:31
 "She's Like a Movie" (Curt Cuomo, Eddie Money, Tommy Girvin) - 4:30
 "Run Your Hurt Away" (David Porter, Isaac Hayes) - 3:16
 "I'll Be the Fire" (Cuomo, Don Kirkpatrick, Money) - 4:24
 "Take It from the Heart" (Cuomo, Kirkpatrick, Money) - 4:15
 "Died a Thousand Times" (Dennis Matkosky, Phil Roy) - 3:48
 "Just No Givin' Up" - (Cuomo, Money) 3:47
 "I'm Comin'" (Money) - 3:57
 "Almost Like We Never Met" (Cuomo, Money, John Nelson) - 4:17
 "Running Out of Reasons" (Cuomo, Money, Larry Lee, Girvin) - 4:37
 "There Will Never Be Another You" (Cuomo, Money, Todd Cerney) - 3:55

Note
 Some copies omit "Running Out of Reasons"

Personnel

 Chris Lord-Alge – mixing
 Kenny Aronoff – drums, percussion
 Tony Artino – guitar
 Robin Beck – background vocals
 Kim Bullard – keyboards, bass pedals, engineer, mixing
 Monty Byrom – background vocals
 Paulinho Da Costa – percussion
 Curt Cuomo – keyboards, percussion, piano, drums, backing vocals, arranger, producer, drum programming, engineer,  mixing
 Sheila E. – percussion
 Michael Ian Elias – background vocals
 Mark Endert – engineer
 Lenita Erickson – background vocals
 Shadelle Farrior – background vocals
 Mike Finnigan – Hammond B-3
 Lisa Frazier – background vocals
 Tommy Funderburk – background vocals
 Tommy Girvin – guitar, background vocals
 Karen Grant – background vocals
 Mark Harris – bass
 Rob Jacobs – engineer, mixing
 Boney James – saxophone
 Mortonette Jenkins – background vocals 
 Steve Kershisnic – bass
 Don Kirkpatrick – guitar
 Brian Malouf – mixing
 Dennis Matkosky – piano, organ, keyboards, arranger, drum programming, engineer, producer
 Eddie Money – lead vocals, background vocals, saxophone, arranger, producer
 Ricky Phillips – bass
 Brian Reeves – engineer, mixing
 John Robinson – drums
 Frank Rosato – engineer
 Phil Roy – arranger
 Don Schiff – bass
 Timothy B. Schmit – background vocals
 John Shanks – guitar
 John Snider – percussion
 Larry Tagg – bass
 Dave "Woody" Woodford – saxophone, horns
 Toby Wright – engineer
 Brian Young – guitar
 Richie Zito – guitar, arranger, producer

Notes 

1995 albums
Eddie Money albums
Albums produced by Richie Zito